Phil Manassa (born 29 January 1956) is a former Australian rules footballer who played with the Collingwood Magpies in the VFL.

He is famous for a goal on the run from the half back flank, which he kicked in the 1977 Grand Final replay. The Phil Manassa Medal is awarded to the winner of the AFL Goal of the Year.

After retiring from playing in the VFL, Manassa played for Devonport in Tasmania and Western Suburbs in Sydney.

References

External links

1956 births
Living people
Australian rules footballers from Victoria (Australia)
Collingwood Football Club players
Devonport Football Club players
Tasmanian State of Origin players
Western Suburbs Magpies AFC players
People educated at Melbourne High School